is a term most often applied to regional specialties (also known as ).

Definition 

 could be classified into the following five categories: 
 , regional Japanese food specialties such as the roasted rice cakes of Hodogaya, and the yam gruel  of Mariko; 
 Japanese crafts as souvenirs such as the swords of Kamakura or the shell-decorated screens of Enoshima;

In the past,  also included: 
 Supernatural souvenirs and wonder-working panaceas, such as the bitter powders of Menoke that supposedly cured a large number of illnesses; 
 Bizarre things that added a touch of the "exotic" to the aura of each location such as the fire-resistant salamanders of Hakone; and 
 Prostitutes, who made localities such as Shinagawa, Fujisawa, Akasaka, Yoshida and Goyu famous. In some cases these people may have encouraged visits to otherwise impoverished and remote localities, contributing to the local economy and the exchange between people of different backgrounds.

Several prints in various versions of the ukiyo-e series The Fifty-Three Stations of the Tōkaidō depict .

Another category are special tea tools that were historic and precious items of Japanese tea ceremony.

Usage 

Examples

In media 
 are key to the promotion of tourism within Japan, and have been frequently depicted in media since the Edo period (1603–1867).

Ukiyo-e

Manga and Anime 
 Ekiben Hitoritabi, food and travel manga about ekiben containing tokusanhin
 Golden Kamuy, a Seinen manga and anime that includes many Ainu meibutsu from Hokkaido including salmon and Ainu cuisine
 Ms. Koizumi Loves Ramen Noodles, a food manga and anime devoted to regional ramen
 Oishii Kamishama (Delicious Venus), a food manga devoted to presenting tokusanhin
 Oishinbo, a Seinen manga and anime that helped launch the gourmet anime genre occasionally featured meibutsu like hōtō or Fukugawa nabe and generally championed the idea of eating fresh, organic, and local
 Omae wa Mada Gunma o Shiranai, comedy manga and anime that presents some meibutsu of Gunma including himokawa udon, yakimanju, hoshi-imo (wind dried sweet potato), and miso pan
 Yakunara Mug Cup Mo, a manga and anime promoting Mino ware and other meibutsu of Tajimi, Gifu Prefecture
 Yatogame-chan Kansatsu Nikki, comedy manga and anime that presents some meibutsu of Nagoya

Television 

 Japanese Style Originator - variety show that presents meibutsu and traditional craftsman as regular segments

See also 
 Japanese craft
Meisho
 Miyagegashi
 Omiyage
 One Village One Product movement
 Tokusanhin

References 

Japanese words and phrases
Japanese popular culture
Memorabilia
Tourism in Japan